José María Rico Cueto (August 12, 1934 – April 15, 2019) was a Spanish-born Costa Rican lawyer and writer specializing in criminal law who served as the First Gentleman of Costa Rica during the presidency of his wife, former President Laura Chinchilla, from 2010 to 2014. Rico was the first First Gentleman in Costa Rica's history.

Biography
Born in Loja, Granada, Spain, he moved in 1965 to Montreal to pursue his career in international law; he would hold Canadian citizenship for the rest of his life. From there he traveled frequently to Latin America and the United States. He was a lawyer and expert in penal code.

In 1990, Rico met his future wife, Laura Chinchilla, while both were working as consultants for the Center for the Administration of Justice at the University of Florida in Miami. The couple had a son, José María Rico Chinchilla, in 1996 and married on March 26, 2000.

On July 11, 2010, Rico accidentally slipped and fell after watching the 2010 FIFA World Cup Final with Chinchilla at a hotel in Nandayure Canton. He suffered massive fractures in his hipbone, femur, and ribs. The next day he was airlifted to Hospital CIMA where he successfully underwent surgery.

Rico was diagnosed with Alzheimer's disease in 2016. In March 2019, he was hospitalized at the Hospital Metropolitano in San Jose, Costa Rica, as his health rapidly declined. Rico died in the same hospital from complications of Alzheimer's disease on April 15, 2019, at the age of 84.

References 

1934 births
2019 deaths
First ladies and gentlemen of Costa Rica
20th-century Costa Rican lawyers
20th-century Canadian lawyers
University of Granada alumni
Université de Montréal alumni
Canadian emigrants to Costa Rica
Canadian people of Spanish descent
People from the Province of Granada